is a Japanese professional footballer of Chinese descent. He plays as a central midfielder for  club Albirex Niigata. He is the son of former Chinese international Gao Sheng.

Career

After graduating from Funabashi High School in Chiba, Ko signed his first professional contract with Gamba Osaka ahead of the 2017 season. He didn't feature for Gamba's senior side during his debut campaign, but played 28 times in J3 for Gamba U-23.

2018 was a more productive year and he started off captaining Gamba U-23, playing a total of 20 games and scoring 3 times.   However, he spent most of the latter half of the year with Gamba's J1 side following the promotion of Gamba U-23 head coach Tsuneyasu Miyamoto.   He made his J1 League debut in Miyamoto's first match as manager, a 1-1 draw at home to Kashima Antlers on July 28 and made a total of 12 league appearances that year. In addition he also played once in the J.League Cup in the quarter final tie against Yokohama F. Marinos.

Career statistics

Honours
 Albirex Niigata
J2 League : 2022

 Individual
J2 League Best XI: 2022

References

External links

1998 births
Living people
Association football people from Kanagawa Prefecture
Japanese footballers
J1 League players
J2 League players
J3 League players
Gamba Osaka players
Gamba Osaka U-23 players
Renofa Yamaguchi FC players
Albirex Niigata players
Japanese sportspeople of Chinese descent
Association football midfielders